Charlemagne was a  74-gun ship of the line of the French Navy, part of the shorter Borée subtype.

Career 
Charlemagne was the first ship of the line to be built in Antwerp according to the wishes of Napoléon, who wanted to expand the French Navy by exploiting shipyards in Belgium, the Netherlands and Italy. In 1807, she was stationed in Vlissingen under Commander Dupotet, in the squadron of Vice-Admiral Missiessy. She aided in the defence of Antwerp against the amphibious raid led by Chatham, and again during the Siege of Antwerp of 1814.

After the Bourbon Restoration, on 30 August 1814, Charlemagne was transferred to the Dutch Navy, as per the Treaty of Paris. The Dutch brought her into service as Nassau.

Notes and references

Notes

References 
 

1807 ships
Ships built in France
Ships of the line of the French Navy
Téméraire-class ships of the line